The Dinghuis (Ding House) is a building in downtown Maastricht, Netherlands, constructed at the end of the 15th century. (Ding is the Dutch name for the governing assembly known in most Germanic languages as a thing.)

The building was constructed in the gothic style of architecture. The northern façade, built around 1470, is timber-framed, and the main façade, built of Namur stone, has a pediment containing a grand clock face. At the top of the steeply sloped roof is a tower that was once used as a lookout.

The  Dinghuis served mainly administrative and judicial functions (a ding/thing being a judicial assembly), and its cellars contained gaols for holding prisoners. In 1713, the Dinghuis also served as a theater. Today, it is home to the town's visitor center.

References
  (2001): Monumentengids Maastricht. Primavera Pers, Leiden. 
  (1974): Rondom Het Maastrichtse Dinghuis. Het Limburgse Monument #2. Schrijen, Maastricht
  (1986): Het Dinghuis. Maastrichts Silhouet #21. Stichting Historische Reeks Maastricht, Maastricht. 
  (2005): Historische Encyclopedie Maastricht. Walburg Pers, Zutphen.

External links 

History of Maastricht
Buildings and structures in Maastricht
Visitor centers